Christopher L. 'Kit' Vaughan, DSc, (born 21 April 1953), is Emeritus Professor of Biomedical Engineering in the Department of Human Biology, University of Cape Town in South Africa.

Scientist
Kit Vaughan is considered a world authority on the biomechanics of human locomotion for which he was recognised with the award of a Doctor of Science in Medicine degree in 2009. He served as President of the International Society of Biomechanics from 1999 to 2001.

Vaughan was the founding director in 2000 of the Medical Imaging Research Unit at the University of Cape Town. He is the author of the award-winning book, Imagining the Elephant, a biography of Allan MacLeod Cormack who won the Nobel Prize in Medicine in 1979 for his contributions to the development of computer assisted tomography.

In 2006 Vaughan was elected a Fellow of the International Academy of Medical and Biological Engineering in recognition of his outstanding contributions to the field, and in 2009 he was awarded an A rating by the National Research Foundation of South Africa as a leading international scholar. In 2010 he took early retirement from the University of Cape Town to serve as chief executive officer of CapeRay Medical (Pty) Ltd, a spin out company that is developing innovative systems to detect breast cancer.

Biography
Born in 1953 to Peter Leslie Vaughan, a mining engineer, and Margaret Baillie Vaughan at Blyvooruitzicht in the Western Transvaal, South Africa, Christopher Leonard 'Kit' Vaughan was educated at Michaelhouse, and then attended Rhodes University where he graduated with honours in 1975, earning a Bachelor of Science degree in applied mathematics and physics with distinction. He represented the university in track and field athletics, golf and weight lifting.

While a student at the University of Iowa, where he received a PhD in musculoskeletal biomechanics in 1980, Vaughan captained the university's rugby team. In 1983 he was a post-doctoral fellow in orthopaedic engineering at Oxford University when he first began to establish himself as a scholar in the field of human locomotion.

Vaughan spent the years 1986 to 1989 as an Associate Professor of Bioengineering at Clemson University, where he published Dynamics of Human Gait that, with the software package Gait Laboratory, was recognised as a seminal contribution to the field. Between 1989 and 1995 he was Professor of Orthopaedics and Biomedical Engineering at the University of Virginia where he directed the motion analysis laboratory and published significant findings on the treatment of children with cerebral palsy.

In 1996 Vaughan returned to South Africa to accept appointment as the Hyman Goldberg Professor of Biomedical Engineering at the University of Cape Town, a position he held until his retirement in 2009.

Vaughan was nominated for the Innovation Prize for Africa 2016.

Ideas
Within the broad spectrum of human locomotion, Vaughan's seminal contributions have been in three separate but related areas: basic theories of human gait; impact of clinical interventions on the neuromuscular system; and engineering tools for human movement scientists.

Vaughan was among the first biomechanical scientists to apply artificial neural network theory to model neuromuscular control of human gait, and also provided key evidence to support the central pattern generator hypothesis. He extended dynamic similarity theory, developing a neuromaturation growth curve and proposing a risk aversion hypothesis for children's gait.

Clinicians in Cape Town pioneered dorsal rhizotomy for the reduction of spasticity in children with cerebral palsy. Over a 20-year period Vaughan led the research to demonstrate that the neurosurgery leads to improved and sustained locomotor function. His GaitCD software package provided scientists with four tools, including animation, bibliography, interactive reference book and 3D gait laboratory.

Publications
 Vaughan CL, "The biomechanics of running gait", CRC Critical Reviews in Biomedical Engineering, 12(1):1–48, 1984
 Vaughan CL, Davis BL, O'Connor JC,  Dynamics of Human Gait, Human Kinetics Publishers, Illinois, 152 pages, 1992
 Sepulveda F, Wells D, Vaughan CL, "A neural network representation of electromyography and joint dynamics in human gait", Journal of Biomechanics, 26: 101–109, 1993
 Vaughan CL, Subramanian N, Busse ME, "Rhizotomy as a treatment option for children with cerebral palsy", Gait & Posture, 8(1): 43–59, 1998
 Vaughan CL, GaitCD, a CD-ROM containing four separate packages: Animate; GaitBib; GaitBook; and GaitLab, Kiboho Publishers, Cape Town, 1999
 Vaughan CL,  "Theories of bipedal gait: an odyssey", Journal of Biomechanics, 36(4): 513–523, 2003
 Vaughan CL, Langerak N, O’Malley MJ  “Neuromaturation of human locomotion revealed by non-dimensional scaling”, Experimental Brain Research, 153: 123–127, 2003
 Vaughan CL, O’Malley MJ  “A gait nomogram used with fuzzy clustering to monitor functional status of children with cerebral palsy", Developmental Medicine and Child Neurology, 47(6): 377–383, 2005
 Vaughan CL, Blaszczyk MB “Dynamic similarity predicts gait parameters for Homo floresiensis and the Laetoli hominins”, American Journal of Human Biology, 20(3): 312–316, 2008
 Vaughan CL, Imagining the Elephant: A Biography of Allan MacLeod Cormack, Imperial College Press, London, 304 pages, 2008

References

1953 births
Living people
South African scientists
Rhodes University alumni
University of Cape Town alumni
Academic staff of the University of Cape Town
Alumni of Michaelhouse